Zacarías Martínez de la Riva (born August 12, 1972) is a Spanish film composer. Notable for his work in Tad, The Lost Explorer, Riva has worked on psychological thrillers, romantic comedies, dramas, documentaries, and animated films, as well as short films and television programs.

Biography 
Riva began a career as a telecommunications engineer. In 1992, he attended to attend the Berklee College of Music in Boston, where he received a dual degree in composition and film scoring.

After graduating, Riva returned to Spain and began working with young directors. He spent his first years as a composer, providing music for short films.

Since 2000, he began collaborating with well-known artists such as Juan Bardem, Lucio Godoy and Roque Baños as an orchestrator. He later made his debut music work in a feature film for the film titled 2001's Jaizkibel. In 2004, he composed the music for the first Tadeo Jones animated short, which won a Goya Award for Best Animated Short. In the same year he composed music for several films, including The Nun, Beneath Still Waters, and Specter.

In 2006, he met film producer Elías Querejeta and worked on a number of documentaries: Noticias de una Guerra (2006), Cerca de Tus Ojos (2008), and Las Catedrales de Vino (2009). In 2007, he met Manuel Carballo and composed the music for his opera, The Last of the Just. He also composed the soundtrack for another feature film, Exorcismus: The Possession of Emma Evans. In 2008, he began to work on international films, including The Anarchist's Wife, Carmo, and Imago Mortis.

In 2014, he wrote the music for science fiction movie Autómata. The score was well received by film music critics, and was nominated for best science fiction soundtrack in a number of festivals. It won 2014 best Spanish soundtrack and 2014 best Spanish composer.

In 2015, he composed music for three feature films. One was Mexican animated film, Un Gallo con Muchos Huevos, which was the first Mexican animated movie to receive a wide release in United States. Another was French experimental film, Evolution, directed by Lucile Hadzihalilovic, which won the Special Jury Prize at San Sebastian’s film festival. The third was an English horror movie, The Rezort, directed by Steve Barker.

In 2016, he composed for the American indie-thriller PET, directed by Carles Torrens. His music has been played by several well-known Spanish orchestras, such as the RTVE orchestra, the Euskadiko Orkester,  the Ciudad de Granada Orchestra and the Tenerife Symphony Orchestra. His piece Apology was used by the 2018 Drum Corps International champions Santa Clara Vanguard as part of their production entitled Babylon.

Filmography

1990s

2000s

2010s

2020s

Awards 

 2014 : Premios Goldspirit a mejor compositor español del año y a mejor banda sonora española del año - Autómata
 2014 : Premio de la Crítica Cinematográfica Española a mejor banda sonora del año - Autómata
 2013 : Premio en el Festival de Medina del Campoo a mejor música original - Sequence
 2007 : Premio en el Festival Internacional de Cine de Alcalá de Henares a mejor música - Tadeo Jones y el sótano maldito
 2006 : Premio en el Festival de CineMálaga a mejor música - Tadeo Jones
 2005 : Premio en el Festival de Cine Dos Hermanas a mejor música - Tadeo Jones
 2004 : Premio en el Festival de Cine de Elche a mejor música - Niebla

Nominations 

 2014 : Premios Film Music Magazine por mejor banda sonora del año - Autómata
 2014 : Premios Film and Video Game Soundtrack por mejor banda sonora del año - Autómata
 2014 : Premios Reel Music por mejor banda sonora del año y mejor banda sonora de ciencia ficción - Autómata
 2014 : Premios Synchrotones por mejor banda sonora del año y mejor banda sonora de ciencia ficción - Autómata
 2014 : Premios Soundtrack Geek por mejor sorpresa del año y mejor banda sonora de ciencia ficción - Autómata
 2014 : Premios IFMCA (International film music critics association) por mejor banda sonora de ciencia ficción - Autómata
 2013 : Premios CEC por mejor banda sonora - Tad, The Lost Explorer
 2013 : Premios Gaudí por mejor banda sonora - Tad, The Lost Explorer
 2013 : Goya a la mejor banda sonora - Tad, The Lost Explorer
 2012 : Premios Goldspirit por mejor compositor español, mejor banda sonora española y mejor banda sonora de animación - Tad, The Lost Explorer
 2011 : Premios Movie Music UK por mejor banda sonora de animación - Copito de Nieve
 2009 : Premios Movie Music UK por compositor revelación
 2009 : Premios Goldspirit por mejor compositor revelación, compositor español y mejor banda sonora española - Hierro
 2009 : Premios IFMCA (International film music critics association) a mejor banda sonora de película de terror - Imago Mortis
 2008 : Premios Jerry Goldsmith por mejor música en largometraje y cortometraje de animación - La mujer del anarquista & Tadeo Jones y el sótano maldito

References

External links
Official website

1972 births
Berklee College of Music alumni
Musicians from Barcelona
Spanish film score composers
Male film score composers
Living people
Spanish male musicians